Only those subjects who are notable enough for their own articles should be included here. That may include chefs who have articles in other languages on Wikipedia which have not as yet been translated into English.
This article is a list of notable chefs and food experts throughout history.

Antiquity 
 Mithaecus
 Apicius, chef to Emperor Trajan

12th century
 Liu Niangzi, Chinese Imperial chef

14th century 
 Sidoine Benoît
 Guillaume Tirel, also known as Taillevent, first professional French master chef

15th century 
 Maestro Martino
 Bartolomeo Platina

16th century 

 Lancelot de Casteau, author of L'Ouverture de cuisine (1604)
 Guillaume Fouquet de la Varenne
 Bartolomeo Scappi, author of Opera dell'Arte del Cucinare (1570)

17th century 

 Procopio Cutò, Sicilian chef in Paris, founder of Cafe Procopio
 Stanisław Czerniecki, author of Compendium ferculorum, albo Zebranie potraw, the first cookbook written originally in Polish
 François Pierre de la Varenne, author of Le Cuisinier françois (1651)
 François Vatel, maître d'hôtel to Nicolas Fouquet and to Grand Condé

18th century 

 Nicolas Appert, pioneer of canning
 Antoine Beauvilliers, pioneering restaurateur
 Hercules, chef of George Washington, and first US Presidential chef
 François Massialot, author of Le cuisinier royal et bourgeois (1712) and Le nouveau cuisinier royal et bourgeois (1717)
 Vincent la Chapelle, author of Cuisinier moderne (1733)
 Menon, author of Nouveau Traité de la Cuisine (1739) and La Cuisinière bourgeoise (1746)
 Paul Tremo, court chef to King Stanislaus Augustus of Poland
James Hemings, personal, enslaved, chef to Thomas Jefferson. First American chef to be fully trained in France, commonly attributed as the origin of Macaroni and cheese.

19th century 

 Marcel Boulestin
 Marie-Antoine Carême, founder of Haute cuisine
 Alexandre Étienne Choron
 Jean-Louis Françoise-Collinet
 George Crum
 Marthe Distel, co-founder of Le Cordon Bleu
 Urbain Dubois, author of numerous works on food and creator of Veal Orloff
 Adolphe Dugléré, head chef of Café Anglais
 Auguste Escoffier
 Fannie Farmer, author of bestselling cookbook (1896)
 Joseph Favre, author of Grand Dictionnaire universel de la cuisine and founder of the Académie culinaire de France
 Charles Elmé Francatelli
 Jules Gouffé
 Lucien Olivier, Belgian-born Russian chef
 Henri-Paul Pellaprat, co-founder of Le Cordon Bleu
Anne Boutiaut Poulard
 Alfred Prunier
 Charles Ranhofer
 Alexis Soyer
 Louis Eustache Ude, author of The French Cook (1813)

20th century 

 

 Ferran Adrià
 Reed Alexander
 Tokuzo Akiyama
 Darin Allen
 Ida Bailey Allen
 Myrtle Allen
 Rachel Allen
 Joey Altman
 Elena Arzak
 Juan Mari Arzak, founder of New Basque Cuisine
 Kenny Atkinson
 Frances Atkins
 Jean Bardet
 Paul Bartolotta
 Joe Bastianich
 Lidia Bastianich
 Mario Batali
 Rick Bayless
 James Beard
 Simone Beck
 Martín Berasategui
 Mary Berry
 John Besh
 Marguerite Bise
 Jack Bishop
 Mark Bittman
 Raymond Blanc
 Heston Blumenthal, pioneer of Molecular gastronomy
 Martin Blunos
 Paul Bocuse
 Ettore Boiardi
 Massimo Bottura
 David Bouley
 Daniel Boulud
 Anthony Bourdain
 Michel Bras
 Madame Brassart
 Eugénie Brazier
 Susan Brookes
 Alton Brown
 Jane Butel
 Caesar Cardini, inventor of Caesar salad (1924)
 Antonio Carluccio
 Andrew Carmellini
 Doña Petrona Carrizo
 Alain Chapel
 Éric Chavot
 Joyce Chen
 Cecilia Chiang
 Chen Kenichi, son of Chen Kenmin 
 Chen Kenmin
 Michael Chiarello
 Julia Child
 Bobby Chinn
 Craig Claiborne
 Patrick Clark
 Gennaro Contaldo
 Helen Corbitt
 Richard Corrigan
 Fanny Cradock
 Curnonsky (Maurice Edmond Sailland)
 Hélène Darroze
 Jean-Robert de Cavel
 Traci Des Jardins
 Avis DeVoto
 Rocco DiSpirito
 Alain Ducasse
 Wylie Dufresne
 Todd English
 Mary Ann Esposito
 Philippe Etchebest
 Hugh Fearnley-Whittingstall
 Susan Feniger
 Annie Féolde
 Barbara Figueroa
 Bobby Flay
 Tyler Florence
 Keith Floyd
 Zonya Foco
 John Folse
 Pierre Franey
 Lois Ellen Frank
 Laura Frankel
 Pierre Gagnaire
 Ina Garten
 Henri Gault
 Alexis Gauthier
 André Gayot
 Adriana Giramonti
 Elka Gilmore
 Frédy Girardet
 Joyce Goldstein
 Rose Gray
 Gael Greene
 Loyd Grossman
 Michel Guérard
 Skye Gyngell
 Martin Hadden
 Dorothy Cann Hamilton
 Ainsley Harriott
 Angela Hartnett
 Marcella Hazan
 Roland Henin
 Ingrid Hoffmann
 Ken Hom
 Peter Hudson and David Halls
 Chuck Hughes
 Annemarie Huste
 Yutaka Ishinabe
 Elijah Joy
 Toshiro Kandagawa
 Sanjeev Kapoor
 Mollie Katzen
 Hubert Keller
 Thomas Keller
 Chen Kenichi
 Diana Kennedy
 Matthew Kenney
 Graham Kerr
 Christopher Kimball
 Masahiko Kobe
 Pierre Koffmann
 Erez Komarovsky
 Ed LaDou
 Emeril Lagasse
 Annabel Langbein
 Nigella Lawson
 Rustie Lee
 Susur Lee
 Ludovic Lefebvre
 Gaston Lenôtre
 Edna Lewis
 Paul Liebrandt
 Cyril Lignac
 Patrick Lin
 Bernard Loiseau
 Emily Luchetti
 Dione Lucas
 Karen MacNeil
 Gualtiero Marchesi
 James Martin
 Rokusaburo Michiba
 Christian Millau
 Prosper Montagné, author of Larousse Gastronomique (1938)
 Rick Moonen
 Masaharu Morimoto
 Sara Moulton
 Tamara Murphy
 Koumei Nakamura
 Joan Nathan
 Rafael Nazario
 Jean-Christophe Novelli
 Jamie Oliver
 Raymond Oliver
 Ken Oringer
 Jean-Louis Palladin
 Charlie Palmer
 Merrilees Parker
 Russ Parsons
 Alain Passard
 Mark Peel
 Jacques Pépin
 Anne-Sophie Pic
 Jacques Pic
 John Pisto
 Fernand Point
 Debra Ponzek
 Anne Boutiaut Poulard
 Paul Prudhomme
 Wolfgang Puck
 Steven Raichlen
 Carmen Ramírez Degollado
 Gordon Ramsay
 Paul Rankin
 Ruth Reichl
 Gary Rhodes
 Éric Ripert
 Claire Robinson
 Joël Robuchon
 Philippe Rochat
 Judy Rogers
 Irma S. Rombauer
 Michel Roux
 Michel Roux Jr.
 Michael Ruhlman
 Carme Ruscalleda
 Hiroyuki Sakai
 Marcus Samuelsson
 Nadia Santini
 Guy Savoy
 Joseph Scarpone
 Alain Senderens
 John Shields
 Nancy Silverton
 Nigel Slater
 Art Smith
 Delia Smith
 Charmaine Solomon
 Henri Soulé
 Rick Stein
 Martha Stewart
 Curtis Stone
 Holger Stromberg
 Michael Symon
 Louis Szathmary
 Sami Tallberg
 Tommy Tang
 John Martin Taylor
 Matt Tebbutt
 Stephen Terry
 Amy Thielen
 Antony Worrall Thompson
 John Thorne
 Sanjay Thumma
 John Torode
 Raquel Torres Cerdán
 Jacques Torres
 Jeremiah Tower
 Jerry Traunfeld
 Troisgros family
 Claude Troisgros
 Pierre Troisgros
 Barbara Tropp
 Charlie Trotter
 Ming Tsai
 Brian Turner
 Roger Vergé
 Marc Veyrat
 Andreas Viestad
 Jean-Georges Vongerichten
 Tetsuya Wakuda
 Gregg Wallace
 Brendan Walsh
 Chef Wan
 Paul Bentley
 Alice Waters
 Jonathan Waxman
 Annabelle White
 Marco Pierre White
 Arlene Williams
 Bryn Williams
 Justin Wilson
 Pierre Wynants
 Martin Yan
 Stephen Yan
 Chan Yan-tak
 Geoffrey Zakarian
 Andrew Zimmern

21st century 

 Connie Achurra
 Samia Ahad
 Noor Al Mazroei
 Reed Alexander
 Rachel Allen
 Ted Allen
 Anjum Anand
 Shauna Anderson
 Sunny Anderson
 José Andrés
 Dave Arnold
 Alex Atala
 Eric Aubriot
 Ed Baines
 Andy Baraghani
 Dan Barber
 Nieves Barragán Mohacho
 Danni Barry
 Tala Bashmi
 Francesco Bellissimo
 Emma Bengtsson
 Ron Ben-Israel
 Bobo Bergström
 Gabriele Bertaccini
 Jamie Bissonnette
 Freddie Bitsoie
 Richard Blais
 April Bloomfield
 Justin Bogle
 Michael Bolster
 Cristina Bowerman
 Danny Bowien
 Sean Brock
 Frank Bruni
 Anne Burrell
 Laura Calder
 Gabriela Cámara
 David Chang
 Erchen Chang
 Maneet Chauhan
 Michael Chiarello
 Gianfranco Chiarini
 May Chow
 Angelo Ciccone
 Derry Clarke
 Mike Colameco
 Tom Colicchio
 Scott Conant
 Cat Cora
 Chris Cosentino
 Denis Cotter
 Madison Cowan
 Carlo Cracco
 Salvatore Cuomo
 Melissa d'Arabian
 Jean-Robert de Cavel
 Paula Deen
 Giada De Laurentiis
 Tiffany Derry
 Traci Des Jardins
 Matt Dowling
 Martie Duncan
 Kevin Dundon
 Ali Salem Edbowa
 Lillian Elidah
 Graham Elliot
 Pete Evans
 Mark Flanagan
 Guy Fieri
 Amy Finley
 Toni Fiore
 Marc Forgione
 Lois Ellen Frank
 Amanda Freitag
 Catherine Fulvio
 Conrad Gallagher
 Jose Garces
 Ali Ghzawi
 Nadia Giosia
 Duff Goldman
 Anette Grecchi Gray
 Suzette Gresham
 Sarah Grueneberg
 Alexandra Guarnaschelli
 Patrick Guilbaud
 Christine Hà
 Elizabeth Haigh
 Carla Hall
 Anna Hansen
 Catherine Healy
 Tanya Holland
 Paul Hollywood
 Ching He Huang
 Robert Irvine
 Rita Jaima Paru
 Colombe Jacobsen
 Margot Janse
 Celia Jiménez
 Pati Jinich
 Mikael Jonsson
 Tony Karim
 Matthew Kenney
 Tom Kerridge
 Karen Keygnaert
 Dawar Khan
 Tara Khattar
 Selin Kiazim
 Anita Klemensen
 Florence Knight
 Erez Komarovsky
 Edward Young-min Kwon
 Kylie Kwong
 Thierry Laborde
 Annabel Langbein
 Jessica Largey
 Vicky Lau
 Katie Lee
 Susur Lee
 Ludo Lefebvre
 Yvan Lemoine
 Alvin Leung
 Travis London
 Nathan Lyon
 Shane Lyons
 Beau MacMillan
 Francis Mallmann
 Neven Maguire
 Karen Martini
 Nikki Martin
 Daisy Martinez
 Nobu Matsuhisa
 Jeff Mauro
 Aaron McCargo, Jr.
 Dylan McGrath
 Lenny McNab
 Lorna McNee
 Claus Meyer, co-founder of New Danish cuisine
 Tommy Miah
 Mary Sue Milliken
 Sarah Minnick
 Rick Moonen
 Saiphin Moore
 Dan Mullane
 Marc Murphy
 Magnus Nilsson
 Michel Nischan
 Kelsey Nixon
 Franco Noriega
 Ben O'Donoghue
 Yotam Ottolenghi
 Enzo Oliveri
 Martha Ortiz
 James Oseland
 Yianni Papoutsis
 Lorraine Pascale
 Mark Peel
 Damaris Phillips
 Suresh Pillai
 Stacey Poon-Kinney
 Wolfgang Puck
 Titti Qvarnström
 Michele Ragussis
 Wendy Rahamut
 Gordon Ramsay
 Rachael Ray
 Jay Rayner
 René Redzepi, co-founder of New Danish cuisine
 Simon Rimmer
 Missy Robbins
 Daniel Rose
 Andre Rush
 Declan Ryan
 Jeffrey Saad
 Marcus Samuelsson
 Aarón Sanchez
 Chris Santos
 Benjamin Sargent
 Miyoko Schinner
 Kamilla Seidler
 Aarti Sequeira
 Sean Sherman
 John Shields
 Nancy Silverton
 Gail Simmons
 Vivek Singh
 Donal Skehan
 Clare Smyth
 Kevin Sousa
 Nick Stellino
 Ripudaman Handa
 Jun Tanaka
 Bryant Terry
 Haile Thomas
 Luke Thomas
 Kevin Thornton
 Sue Torres
 Christina Tosi
 Paolo Tullio
 Bryan Voltaggio
 Nikola Vuković
 Wang Gang
 Justin Warner
 Valentine Warner
 Emily Watkins
 Jody Williams
 Kate Williams
 Brooke E. Williamson
 Lee Anne Wong
 Sophie Wright
 Seiji Yamamoto
 Aldo Zilli
 Peter Ingrasselino (chef)

See also 

 Le Club des Chefs des Chefs
 List of female chefs with Michelin stars
 List of Indian chefs
 List of pastry chefs
 List of food writers

References

External links 
 BBC list of chefs
 PBS list of chefs

 

Chefs
Chefs